Angaria carmencita is a species of sea snail, a marine gastropod mollusk in the family Angariidae.

Description

The shell can grow to be 40 mm to 70 mm.

Distribution
Angaria carmencita can be found off of Thursday Island, North Queensland, and Australia.

References

External links

Angariidae
Gastropods described in 2007